Aleksei Yevlampiyevich Troitsky (1894–1958) was an association football player.

International career
Troitsky made his debut for Russia on July 5, 1914, in a friendly against Sweden.

External links
  Profile

1894 births
1958 deaths
Russian footballers
Russia international footballers
Soviet footballers
FC Dynamo Moscow players

Association football forwards